The Jack Eigen Show was an American television show, 15 minutes in duration, which aired Thursdays 7:45 to 8:00 pm ET on the DuMont Television Network from 1947 to 1951, The show continued as a radio program from 1951 to 1971, running from 11:15pm to 12:30am ET on WMAQ (AM).

Broadcast history
Eigen (1913–1983) hosted two different television series, both local series which were briefly on the DuMont network.

WABD television series
A television version aired from 1947 to circa 1951 on New York City television station WABD, at that time part of the DuMont Television Network. An early episode featured Milton Berle as a guest. Other segments included the playing of records and the reading of gossip. In late 1950, Ansonia Clock Company became sponsor of the series.

Preservation status
As with most DuMont series, no episodes are known to exist.

See also
List of programs broadcast by the DuMont Television Network
List of surviving DuMont Television Network broadcasts

Bibliography
David Weinstein, The Forgotten Network: DuMont and the Birth of American Television (Philadelphia: Temple University Press, 2004) 
Alex McNeil, Total Television, Fourth edition (New York: Penguin Books, 1980) 
Tim Brooks and Earle Marsh, The Complete Directory to Prime Time Network TV Shows, Third edition (New York: Ballantine Books, 1964)

References

External links
The Jack Eigen Show at IMDB
Eigen bio with pics at RichSamuels website

1947 American television series debuts
1951 American television series endings
DuMont Television Network original programming
American live television series
English-language television shows
Black-and-white American television shows
Local television programming in the United States
Lost television shows